St. Louis Community College–Florissant Valley (also known as STLCC-Florissant Valley, Florissant Valley, Flo Valley) is a public community college in Ferguson, in the U.S. state of Missouri. It is one of the four schools of the St. Louis Community College System and is one of nine community colleges in Greater St. Louis. Over 7,000 students attend Florissant Valley.

Campus 
The college is located in close proximity with the University of Missouri-St. Louis.

Notable programs 

FV is the major Art and Theatre campus in the STLCC system.  Students can get Associate in Applied Science (AAS)Degrees in Graphic Communications or Associate in Fine Arts (AFA) Degrees in General Fine Arts, Graphic Communications, Art Education and Photography.  Students also have the option of starting a Bachelor of Fine Arts degree and then transferring to University of Missouri-St. Louis.

The Fischer Theatre serves as the hub of the Theatre program at FVCC.

The campus is also known for engineering, technology, and applied science degree programs (such as biotechnology).

The most successful of which is the Chemical Technology program, a program that prepares students to work as chemical laboratory technicians and boasts a job placement rate of over 95%. As well as being well known to many chemical, environmental or industrial companies in the Saint Louis area for a good source of future well-trained employees.

Athletics 
STLCC operates as a single entity in athletic competition; Florissant Valley students are permitted to participate if eligible.

Florissant Valley serves as the "home field" for Men's Soccer and Women's Volleyball.

Prior to STLCC consolidating all athletic programs under one banner, STLCC-Florissant Valley (which was known as the Fury) won 13 NJCAA Championships, of which ten were in Men's Soccer.

Notable alumni
Debra Dickerson attended the college but did not take a degree.

See also
St. Louis Community College

References

External links
St. Louis Community College STLCC-Florissant Valley

Florissant Valley
Two-year colleges in the United States
Educational institutions established in 1971
Universities and colleges in St. Louis County, Missouri